Sayville Congregational Church, also known as Sayville Congregational United Church of Christ, is a historic Congregational church at 131 Middle Road in Sayville, Suffolk County, New York.  It was built in 1888 and is a Shingle Style building with a cross gabled roof, two prominent towers, and fish-scale shingles.  It features a three-story, square bell tower with rounded, turret-like corners.

It was added to the National Register of Historic Places in 2005.

References

External links
Sayville Congregational Church Official Website

Churches on the National Register of Historic Places in New York (state)
Queen Anne architecture in New York (state)
Shingle Style church buildings
Churches in Suffolk County, New York
National Register of Historic Places in Suffolk County, New York
Churches completed in 1888
1888 establishments in New York (state)
Shingle Style architecture in New York (state)